Kerly Santos (born 9 August 1970) is a Brazilian volleyball player. She competed in the women's tournament at the 1988 Summer Olympics.

References

External links
 

1970 births
Living people
Brazilian women's volleyball players
Olympic volleyball players of Brazil
Volleyball players at the 1988 Summer Olympics
Sportspeople from São Paulo
Pan American Games medalists in volleyball
Pan American Games silver medalists for Brazil
Medalists at the 1991 Pan American Games